Havannah Channel is a marine passageway in the South Coast region of British Columbia, Canada, leading off of the north side of Johnstone Strait leading to Chatham Channel and Call Inlet, south of East Cracroft Island. Havannah Channel is entered from Johnstone Strait at the Broken Islands. Hull Island is located in the channel, to the southeast of East Cracroft and south of the opening of Call Inlet.

Name origin
Havannahs captain was Thomas Harvey, namesake of Port Harvey, which is a bay or port on the north side of the channel formed by the division of the two Cracroft Islands.

Indian reserves and villages

References

Channels of British Columbia
Central Coast of British Columbia